Vijayawada East (Assembly constituency) or (Patamata) is a constituency in NTR district of Andhra Pradesh, representing the state legislative assembly in India. As per the Delimitation Orders (1967), the constituency was formed. It is one of the seven assembly segments of Vijayawada Lok Sabha constituency, along with Tiruvuru (SC), Vijayawada Central, Vijayawada West, Mylavaram, Nandigama, and Jaggayyapeta. Gadde Ramamohan is the present MLA of the constituency, who won the 2019 Andhra Pradesh Legislative Assembly election from Telugu Desam Party. , there are a total of 275,655 electors in the constituency.

Mandals 

The mandal and wards that form the assembly constituency are:

Members of Legislative Assembly 

Gadde Ramamohan is the present MLA of the constituency representing the Telugu Desam Party.

Election results

Assembly elections 2019

Assembly elections 2014

Assembly Elections 2009

See also 
 List of constituencies of the Andhra Pradesh Legislative Assembly
 Vijayawada West (Assembly constituency)
 Vijayawada Central (Assembly constituency)

References 

Assembly constituencies of Andhra Pradesh